The Hong Kong Film Award for Best Supporting Actress  is an annual Hong Kong industry award presented to an actress for the best performance by an actress in a supporting role.

History
The award was established at the 4th Hong Kong Film Awards (1985) and the first winner was Anita Mui for her role in the film Behind the Yellow Line. There are 5, sometimes 6, nominations for the category of Best Supporting Actress from which one actress is chosen the winner of the Hong Kong Film Award for Best Supporting Actress. The most recent recipient of the award was Fish Liew, who was honoured at the 40th Hong Kong Film Awards (2022), for her performance in Anita.

The actress with most awards in this category is Elaine Jin with 4 awards. There are six actresses who have been awarded in both the categories for leading and supporting roles, Anita Mui, Cecilia Yip, Zhou Xun, Deanie Ip, Kara Wai and Teresa Mo.

Winners and nominees

Multiple wins and nominations

Multiple wins

Multiple nominations

See also 
 Hong Kong Film Award
 Hong Kong Film Award for Best Actor
 Hong Kong Film Award for Best Actress
 Hong Kong Film Award for Best Supporting Actor
 Hong Kong Film Award for Best Action Choreography
 Hong Kong Film Award for Best Cinematography
 Hong Kong Film Award for Best Director
 Hong Kong Film Award for Best Film
 Hong Kong Film Award for Best New Performer

References

External links
 Hong Kong Film Awards

Film awards for supporting actress
Awards established in 1985
Hong Kong Film Awards
1985 establishments in Hong Kong